Wheelchair Fencing at the 2004 Summer Paralympics was competed in Category A and B. Category A contestants were those with good sitting balance and normal fencing arm, while Category B contestants were somewhat impaired in either of these areas. The events were held at the Helliniko Fencing Hall.

Participating countries

Medal table

Medal summary

Men's events

Women's events

See also 
Fencing at the 2004 Summer Olympics

References 

 

 
2004 Summer Paralympics events
Wheelchair fencing at the Summer Paralympics
2004 in fencing
International fencing competitions hosted by Greece